is a Japanese motorcycle racer. In 2021 he races in the Superbike World Championship, aboard a Yamaha YZF-R1. He was the All Japan J-GP2 champion in 2013 and the All Japan JSB1000 champion in 2020.

Career

Moto2 World Championship

Yamaha VR46 Mastercamp Team (from 2023)
Nozane competed to Moto2 World Championship from 2023 with Yamaha VR46 Mastercamp Team.

Career statistics

Grand Prix motorcycle racing

By season

Races by year
(key) (Races in bold indicate pole position, races in italics indicate fastest lap)

Superbike World Championship

Races by year
(key) (Races in bold indicate pole position, races in italics indicate fastest lap)

* Season still in progress.

References

External links

1995 births
Living people
Japanese motorcycle racers
Moto2 World Championship riders
Tech3 MotoGP riders
MotoGP World Championship riders
Superbike World Championship riders